Filip Urban (born 23 March 1982) is a former Polish tennis player.

Urban has a career high ATP singles ranking of 333 achieved on 8 August 2005. He also has a career high ATP doubles ranking of 172 achieved on 8 August 2005.

Urban represented Poland at the Davis Cup, where he had a W/L record of 4–1.

External links

1982 births
Living people
Polish male tennis players
Sportspeople from Poznań
People from Wałbrzych
Universiade medalists in tennis
Universiade bronze medalists for Poland
Medalists at the 2005 Summer Universiade